Delta(14)-sterol reductase is an enzyme that in humans is encoded by the TM7SF2 gene.

References

Further reading